C. L. Ruala (born 25 December 1935) is an Indian politician from Mizoram and  member of the Indian National Congress. He was a Member of Parliament of the 16th Lok Sabha, the lower house of the Indian Parliament. He was elected from the only one-seat Mizoram constituency. He won over Robert Romawia, IND candidate, and M. Lalmanzuala, Aam Aadmi Party candidate, by getting a total vote 210,485 (48.7%). He was also elected member in the previous term during 2009-2014.

Education
After schooling in Mizoram he was educated at St. Edmund's College, Shillong (under Gauhati University) and graduated with B.A. and B.T.

Personal life
Ruala was born in a small village of Chawnhu in southern Mizoram to father Thanzinga and mother Thangpuii. He  married Lalhmingthangi on 8 February 1966, and they have five sons.

Career
He became a teacher before he entered politics. Ruala became a successful politician since he was nominated to the Mizo District Council (when Mizoram was under Government of Assam) in 1970. After Mizoram became a Union Territory he was elected to member of the Mizoram Legislative Assembly. He became Cabinet Minister during 1984-1987. His career was interrupted by the Mizoram Peace Accord in 1987 when the ruling Congress Party surrendered their government to make way for settlement between Mizo National Front and Government of India. He won the next Mizoram general election in 1989, and the subsequent elections in 1993. During these two terms he was a Cabinet Minister. From 1998 he took official works in the party office for ten years. In 2009, he was elected as Member of Parliament to the 15th Lok Sabha, and again in 2014 to the 16th Lok Sabha.

References

External links
 Fifteenth Lok Sabha Members Bioprofile in Lok Sahba website

India MPs 2009–2014
1935 births
Living people
Mizoram politicians
People from Lawngtlai district
Mizoram MLAs 1984–1987
India MPs 2014–2019
Lok Sabha members from Mizoram
Indian National Congress politicians
Mizo people
Mizoram MLAs 1978–1979